Exit Eden is an international symphonic metal supergroup that performs cover versions of well-known pop and rock songs.

Background 
The band was formed in 2017 by the American singer Amanda Somerville (Avantasia, Alice Cooper, Epica, HDK, Kiske/Somerville, Aina, Trillium), the Brazilian singer Marina La Torraca (Phantom Elite), the French singer Clémentine Delauney (Visions of Atlantis, ex-Serenity) and the German-American singer Anna Brunner. The band started posting in July 2017, in YouTube the first metal-cover clips from their debut album Rhapsodies in Black, which reached thousands of views within a few days and hit No. 15 in the German album charts.

Several musicians, sound engineers and producers from the metal scene, like Simone Simons (Epica), Hardy Krech, Mark Nissen, Johannes Braun (Kissin’ Dynamite), Jim Müller (Kissin’ Dynamite), Sascha Paeth (Avantasia, Edguy, Kamelot), Evan K (Mystic Prophecy) have cooperated for the album release.

Band members 
Exit Eden
Amanda Somerville - vocals
Anna Brunner - vocals
Clémentine Delauney - vocals
Marina La Torraca - vocals

Discography

Albums 
 2017: Rhapsodies in Black (Starwatch Entertainment/Napalm Records)

Music videos 
 2017: Unfaithful (Rihanna cover) (Starwatch Entertainment/Napalm Records)
 2017: Impossible (Shontelle cover) (Starwatch Entertainment/Napalm Records)
 2017: Incomplete (Backstreet Boys cover) (Starwatch Entertainment/Napalm Records)
 2017: Paparazzi (Lady Gaga cover) (Starwatch Entertainment/Napalm Records)
 2017: Total Eclipse of the Heart (Bonnie Tyler cover) (Starwatch Entertainment/Napalm Records)
 2017: A Question of Time (Depeche Mode cover) (Starwatch Entertainment/Napalm Records)

References

External links 
 Exit Eden (Official site)
 

Symphonic metal musical groups